Burgthann is a municipality in the district Nürnberger Land, in Bavaria, Germany. It is situated 20 km southeast of Nuremberg (centre).

References

Nürnberger Land